Refuge du Promontoire is a refuge in the Alps located in France in the massif des Ecrins, it is just build on rock in front of the South face of La Meije. It's the starting point of the famous crossing of La Meije, which is known to be one of the most beautiful mountain run into the Alps.

The access is made from La Bérarde by le vallon des Étançons, or from La Grave by les Enfetchores and la brêche de la Meije.

The shelter was first constructed in the 1920s out of wood. In 1966, this was demolished and replaced by an aluminium construction.

Mountain huts in the Alps
Mountain huts in France